The 2016 W-League grand final was the final match of the 2015–16 W-League season and decided the champions of women's football in Australia for the season. 

The match took place at AAMI Park in Melbourne, Australia on 31 January 2016 and was played between league premiers Melbourne City and two-time premiers of the league Sydney FC. The match was won by Melbourne City 4–1 who competed the perfect season, failing to lose a match all season. It was also Melbourne City's first championship of any kind in Australian football and ensured the club won all available silverware in women's football in their inaugural season. Kim Little, playing for Melbourne City for the season on loan from Seattle Reign FC, was named the player of the match.

Teams

Route to the final

Match details

Match statistics
The following are the match statistics for the 2016 W-League grand final:

See also
 List of W-League champions

References

External links

Grand final
Soccer in Melbourne
A-League Women Grand Finals